High Speed Digital Spirit Processing is the second album by PAX, a side project of Sevren Ni-arb from X Marks the Pedwalk and former X Marks the Pedwalk producer AL/X/S. The album peaked at #22 on the CMJ RPM Charts in the U.S.

Track listing
 "Visual Effect" – 4:12
 "Tesselated Parts" – 4:16
 "Tempted Rose" – 6:29
 "Accolyte" – 6:36
 "Drip" – 6:29
 "The Providence" – 6:03
 "Frozen Landscape" – 4:51
 "Outfaced!" – 5:28
 "Antafagosta" – 5:14
 "Be Prepared" – 5:02
 "Accolyte (Dark Illumination Remix)" – 7:03
 "Accolyte (Funker Vogt Remix)" – 4:52

References

X Marks the Pedwalk albums
1998 albums
Zoth Ommog Records albums